Gary Powell (born 2 April 1969) is an English footballer. He is currently the first-team coach at Stockport County.

In November 1990, he joined Scunthorpe United on a month's loan, scoring in his second game against York City but failing to appear in a winning side during his stay.

He joined Altrincham in December 1993, debuting in the 1–0 Football Conference victory at Witton Albion on 18 December 1993. He scored one league goal for the club, in the 2–0 home victory over Dover Athletic on 26 February 1994, before moving on to Macclesfield Town at the end of March. He scored twice in the Football Conference for the Macclesfield, scoring the winner in the 1–0 home win over Welling United on 2 May and the equaliser in the final match of the season five days later, a 1–1 draw at Northwich Victoria.

In July 2002 he left The New Saints F.C. to join Rhyl for a third time. He scored Rhyl's first goal in European football in the 3–1 home UEFA Champions League qualifying defeat to Skonto Riga on 21 July 2004. A year later, his 60th-minute goal in a 3–2 away defeat enabled Rhyl to become only the second Welsh Premiership side to win a European tie after beating FK Atlantas on away goals in the UEFA Cup first qualifying round. In June 2010, he was appointed first-team coach at Chester. He left Chester on 21 January 2014.

References

External links
Lincoln City F.C. official archive profile

1969 births
Living people
People from Hoylake
Everton F.C. players
Lincoln City F.C. players
Scunthorpe United F.C. players
Wigan Athletic F.C. players
Bury F.C. players
Altrincham F.C. players
Macclesfield Town F.C. players
Bangor City F.C. players
Rhyl F.C. players
Conwy Borough F.C. players
The New Saints F.C. players
Flint Town United F.C. players
Chester F.C. non-playing staff
Cymru Premier players
English Football League players
Association football forwards
English footballers